Minotauria is a genus of Balkan woodlouse hunting spiders that was first described by Władysław Kulczyński in 1903.  it contains only two species: M. attemsi and M. fagei. In 1847, it was argued to be a synonym of Stalita.

References

Araneomorphae genera
Dysderidae